The Roman Catholic Church in Ghana (West Africa) is composed solely of a Latin hierarchy, joint in the national Episcopal Conference of Ghana, comprising a single pre-diocesan (exempt) apostolic vicariate and four ecclesiastical provinces, each headed by a Metropolitan Archdiocese, with a total of 15 suffragan dioceses.

There are no Eastern Catholic jurisdictions or quasi-diocesan ordinariates.

There are no titular sees. All defunct jurisdictions have current successor sees.

There is an Apostolic Nunciature to Ghana (in national capital Accra) as papal diplomatic representation (embassy-level).

Current Latin dioceses

Immediately Subject to the Holy See 
 pre-diocesan Apostolic Vicariate of Donkorkrom

Latin provinces

Ecclesiastical Province of Accra
 Metropolitan Archdiocese of Accra
Roman Catholic Diocese of Ho
Roman Catholic Diocese of Jasikan
Roman Catholic Diocese of Keta-Akatsi
Roman Catholic Diocese of Koforidua

Ecclesiastical Province of Cape Coast
 Metropolitan Archdiocese of Cape Coast
Roman Catholic Diocese of Sekondi-Takoradi
Roman Catholic Diocese of Wiawso

Ecclesiastical Province of Kumasi
 Metropolitan Archdiocese of Kumasi
Roman Catholic Diocese of Goaso
Roman Catholic Diocese of Konongo-Mampong
Roman Catholic Diocese of Obuasi
Roman Catholic Diocese of Sunyani
Roman Catholic Diocese of Techiman

Ecclesiastical Province of Tamale
 Metropolitan Archdiocese of Tamale
Roman Catholic Diocese of Damongo
Roman Catholic Diocese of Navrongo-Bolgatanga
Roman Catholic Diocese of Wa
Roman Catholic Diocese of Yendi

See also 
 Catholic Church in Ghana
 List of Catholic dioceses (structured view)

Sources and external links 
 GCatholic.org - data for all sections.
 Catholic-Hierarchy entry.

Ghana
Catholic dioceses